Echinocereus knippelianus is a species of hedgehog cactus native to Mexico, found at high altitudes of 2000 to 2400 meters. It can be grown in cultivation.

References

knippelianus
Plants described in 1895